Dinajpur district is a district in the Rangpur Division of northern Bangladesh. Dinajpur is the largest district among all sixteen northern districts of Bangladesh.

History 
Dinajpur was once a part of the ancient state of Pundravardhana. It is also called "City of Maharajas".

An ancient engraved stone, believed to be from the Gupta era, was recovered from the bank of a pond near Sura Masjid in the Ghoraghat Upazila in Dinajpur in 8 October.

British Colonial Period
The British administrative control in Dinajpur was established in 1786. Dinajpur was the biggest administrative district of undivided Bengal. In 1765, the British got the Dewani of Bengal and in 1772 an English District Collector and Chief of Revenue was appointed in Dinajpur. The area was then notorious for lawlessness. Mr. Marriott was Collector in 1786. Next to him, Mr. Red Fern and Mr. Vansittart were Collectors for short periods. The next Collector, Mr. Hatch, started to exercise judicial powers too. The District Magistrate's area at that time extended to Malda, Bagura, and Dinajpur. In the last decade of the 18th century, indigo plantation started in the district.

The district Dinajpur in British times included a greater portion of Bagura. Malda and parts of Rajshahi, Rangpur, and Purnea. Between 1795 and 1800, large tracts of land were transferred to Purnea, Rangpur and Rajshahi for administrative convenience and better enforcement of law and order. In 1833 again some estates were transferred to Bagura and Malda. In 1864–65, 1868 and 1870 further transfer of territory from Dinajpur to Malda and Bagura took place. Finally in 1897–98 the whole of Thana Mahadevpur was made over to Rajshahi. At that time, except Thakurgaon Sub division, the rest of Dinajpur district remained under the direct supervision of the collector.

At first, after its formation in 1856, the Dinajpur Municipality used to be run by a town committee presided over by the Deputy Magistrate. This was among the first 40 municipalities in Bengal at that time. Later in 1868, the 'District Town Act' commissioned a chairman of the municipality who replaced the Deputy Magistrate and given a similar rank as a district magistrate. Mr. Patterson was appointed the first chairman of Dinajpur Municipality in 1869.

Recent history 
At the time of Partition of India in 1947, part of greater Dinajpur district was included in West Bengal and it was named West Dinajpur district. People of the district took part in the Tebhaga movement and also had significant contribution in the War of Liberation of 1971.

Geography 
Dinajpur is bounded by Thakurgaon and Panchagarh districts in the north, Gaibandha and Joypurhat districts in the south, Nilphamari and Rangpur districts in the east, and the state of West Bengal, India in the west. The total area of the district is 3,437.98 km2. The main rivers of the district are the Dhepa, the Punarbhaba, and the Atrai rivers.

Total area 3437.98 km2, located in between 25°10' and 26°04' north latitudes and in between 88°23' and 89°18' east longitudes.

Climate 
Dinajpur experiences a hot, wet and humid tropical climate. Under the Köppen climate classification, Dinajpur has a tropical wet and dry climate. The district has a distinct monsoonal season, with an annual average temperature of 25 °C (77 °F) and monthly means varying between 18 °C (64 °F) in January and 29 °C (84 °F) in August.

Demographics 

According to the 2011 Bangladesh census, Dinajpur District had a population of 2,990,128, of which 1,508,670 were males and 1,481,458 females. Rural population was 2,536,429 (84.83%) while the urban population was 453,699 (15.17%). Dinajpur district had a literacy rate of 52.42% for the population 7 years and above: 55.68% for males and 49.12% for females.

Muslims make up 75.03% of the population, while Hindus are 19.51% and Christians 4.25%. People of other religions were 1.19% of the population. Ethnic minorities were 66,861 (2.24%) of the population.

Economy 

The economy of Dinajpur mainly depends upon agriculture based production. There is a well known proverb about Dinajpur – 'paddy piled up high, sheds full of cows, ponds brimming with fish' [gola bhora dhan, goyal bhora goru, pukur bhora mach]. People in this district are much happier than those in other districts, everything grows easily, it's a peaceful place. Dinajpur is famous for rice production. 'Katharivog' rice is one of the best produced rice in Bangladesh. Dinajpur is also rich with wheat production. The Lychee (fruit) of Dinajpur is the best of Bangladesh. Dinajpur is well known for its production of among the country.
Dinajpur is also famous for its Mangoes. "Kosba" is called the matrix of mango. Also it grows a plenty of vegetables and seasonal fruits. A huge percentage of people from Dinajpur depends upon agri based products. The main industry also includes rice processing mills.
However, Dinajpur is highly rich with natural resources like coal, pit mine. Of the five coal field discovered so far in Bangladesh, three are in Dinajpur. The name of these deposits are-Barapukuria, Phulbari and Dighipara coal field. At present coal is being produced commercially only from the Barapukuria underground coal mine in Dinajpur district. Current production rate is about 1500 tons per day. The plan to establish an open-pit mine in nearby Phulbari was aborted in 2006 in the wake of a mass protest by the local people. The coal from the Boropukuria Coal Mine is being fed to the 250MW Barapukuria Power Station.

Crops and grown in the district include rice, wheat, maize, potato, brinjal, and tomato.

Fruits grown include lychees, mangoes, bananas, jackfruits, and blackberries.

Points of interest 

 Ananda Sagar
 Aowkora Mosquemeaning "Echoing Mosque"
 Baraduari
 Dinajpur Museum
 Dinajpur Rajbari
 Dinajpur Zila School
 Dipshikha School in Rudrapur
 Ghughu-danga Zamindar Bari
 Gorashohid Boro-Moydan
 Gour Gabindha
 Habra Zamindar Bari
 Hili Land PortThe second-largest land port of Bangladesh and customs station for border trade.
 Kaliya jue Temple
 Kantajew TempleA late medieval Hindu temple, built from 1704 to 1722 CE
 Korai Bill, Biral
 Matasagar
 Nayabad Mosque
 Nowpara Ideal Village
 Ramsagar
 Shingha DarwazaMeaning "Lion Gate"
 Shita Coat Bihar The oldest Buddhist Bihar in the world.
 Shopnopuri artificial amusement park
 Shimanta Shikha club, Hakimpur, Dinajpur.
 Shita Coat Bihar, Nawabganj
 Singra forest, Birganj
 Sita Kuthuri
 Sukhsagar
 The tombs of Chehel Gazi and Gor-e-Shahid Moydan.

Administration
 Deputy Commissioner (DC): Khaled Mohammad Zaki.
 Administrator of Zila Parishad: Azizul Imam Chowdhury

Subdistricts 

The upazilas of this district are:
 Biral Upazila
 Birampur Upazila
 Birganj Upazila
 Bochaganj Upazila
 Chirirbandar Upazila
 Dinajpur Sadar Upazila
 Ghoraghat Upazila
 Hakimpur Upazila
 Kaharole Upazila
 Khansama Upazila
 Nawabganj Upazila
 Parbatipur Upazila
 Fulbari Upazila

Transport 

 Railway Station:
 Dinajpur railway station
 Chirirbandar railway station
 Biral railway station
 Hili railway station
 Parbatipur railway junction
 Fulbari railway station
 Birampur railway station
 Setabgonj railway station
 Kholahati railway station
 Roads & Highways:
 Dinajpur- Dhaka Highway (Via Fulbari, Birampur)
 Dinajpur-Dhaka Highway (Via Rangpur)
 Dinajpur- Panchogor
 Dinajpur- Rangpur Highway (Via Parbotipur)
 Dinajpur- Thakurgaon Highway
 Dinajpur- Dakshin Dinajpur(India) International Highway

Education 

Educational institutions in the district include: 1 university, 118 colleges, 10 vocational institutes, 1 textile institute, 617 secondary school, 1713 primary schools, 11 community schools, 29 non-government schools, 10 kindergartens, 351 madrasas. Noted educational institutions are following:

Hajee Mohammad Danesh Science and Technology University 

It serves as an institution of science and technology in northern part of the country. Hajee Mohammad Danesh Science and Technology University was established as an Agricultural Extension Training Institute (AETI) to award a three-year diploma in agriculture. The AETI was later upgraded to Hajee Mohammad Danesh Agricultural College in 1988 having an affiliation from the Bangladesh Agricultural University, Mymensingh. Then the college was upgraded to the status of a university renaming it as Hajee Mohammad Danesh Science and Technology University. First batch of the students were admitted at that time (1999-2000 session). The act of the university was passed on 8 July 2001 in the Jatio Shongsad (National Assembly) was followed by a gazette notification on 8 April 2002.

Dinajpur Medical College and Hospital 
It is a government medical college here, which is one of the 36 government funded medical colleges in Bangladesh. It is located in the town of Dinajpur. It admits 160 students into the f-year MBBS (Bachelor of Medicine and Bachelor of Surgery) degree program. There is a four-story building. There are two hostels for boys and three hostels for girls. There are four hostels for intern doctors. About twenty batches of students have passed from this medical college. Dinajpur Medical College Journal is recognised by the BMDC and is published twice a year. The 500-bed hospital has high technology and has started to provide more services. There is also a well-developed nursing college behind the hospital building. The hospital has an ultrasound centre for nuclear medicine near Sadar Hospital, Dinajpur. Dinajpur Medical College Hospital now provides health services not only in the Dinajpur District but also to people from other districts near Dinajpur.

Dinajpur Zilla School
This district gives the opportunity to read in two Govt. schools, Dinajpur Zilla School (for boys only) and Dinajpur Govt. Girls' High School. Dinajpur Zilla School was established in 1854 during the British reign. It is located at the centre of the Dinajpur town. It owns a hostel too for residential facilities. This school is one of 20 schools in Bangladesh, which has a government funded "E-Learning" facility and E-Laboratory. There is Stone made Map of South Asia subcontinent in this school, which was made at 1934. It has a very talented Score in S.S.C participation. There is also an auditorium, a sculpture of celebrating the 150 years of the school, a mosque, an enhanced library and laboratory in this school.

Dinajpur Government Girl's High School

Dinajpur polytechnic institute
Dinajpur polytechnic institute is at south Balubari. This polytechnic was started with Civil and Power Technology in 1964.

There are three government colleges in the Dinajpur town. Dinajpur Government College, which was previously known as Surendranath college and Dinajpur City College are for both male and female students. Another government college is "Dinajpur Government Women's College" is for female students only. All colleges are operated under Bangladesh National University.

Others 
The METI Handmade School, a primary school for 169 students located in Rudrapur in Dinajpur district, was built with the assistance of local craftsmen making use of traditional materials, primarily mud and bamboo. An example of sustainable architecture, the project received the Aga Khan Award for Architecture in 2007, not only for its simple, humane approach and beauty but also for the level of cooperation achieved between architects, craftsmen, clients and users. There is also a textile institute. Now RIDGE School is the most modern and British standard popular school of Dinajpur.

Dinajpur Central Shahid Minar is the 2nd largest Shahid minar in the country. Dinajpur Boasts a regional training centre of Bangladesh Krira Shiksha Pratisthan. Bangladesh Krira Shiksha Pratisthan situated at Basher hat near to HSTU campus. It aims to train and educate sports prodigy.

Notable residents 
 Heyat Mahmud (1693–1760), medieval poet
 Narayan Gangopadhyay, a Bengali novelist, poet, essayist, and short story writer, and one of the leading writers of modern Bengali literature
 Atmasthananda, fifteenth president of the Ramakrishna Math and the Ramakrishna Mission
 Debojyoti Mishra, an Indian music director and film composer
 Khaleda Zia Born in 1945, former Prime Minister of Bangladesh and current leader of the Bangladesh National Party
 Khurshid Jahan 1939–2006, former Bangladeshi Minister of Women's and Children's affairs
 Haji Mohammad Danesh 1900–1986, Bangladeshi politician and communist activist
 M. Yousuf Ali Died in 1999, first Bangladeshi Minister of Education
 Muhammad Mahbubur Rahman – 9th Chief of Army Staff (abbreviated as CAS) of Bangladesh Army from May 1996 to December 1997. Now he is a member of BNP's standing committee.
 M. Abdur Rahim  (21 November 1927 – 4 September 2016) was a Member of Parliament, member of the constitution drafting committee and an organiser of the liberation war
 Abdullah Al Kafi (1945–2005), Member of Parliament for Dinajpur-1
 Moinuddin Ahmed Chowdhury 1921–1998, prominent East Pakistani politician
 Subhash Dutta (9 February 1930 – 16 November 2012) was a Bangladeshi filmmaker, theatre and film actor
 Nitun Kundu founder of OTOBI furniture groupe and designer of the fountain of SAARC fountain in front of Hotel Sonargaon
 Dhiman Ghosh Bangladeshi cricketer
 Liton Das Bangladeshi cricketer
 Lucas Marandi, Roman Catholic Bishop

See also 
 Districts of Bangladesh
 Rangpur Division

Notes

References

Further reading

 

 
Districts of Rangpur Division
Districts of Bangladesh established before 1971
1786 establishments in Asia
1780s establishments in British India
1786 establishments in the British Empire
Districts of Bangladesh